Bernardo Ruiz Navarrete (born 8 January 1925) is a Spanish former professional road bicycle racer who won the overall and climbers competition at the 1948 Vuelta a España. He went on to become the first Spaniard to take two wins in a single edition of the Tour de France in 1951, the first to finish on the overall podium at the Tour the following year, and the first to win a stage of the Giro d'Italia in 1955. Alasdair Fotheringham has described him as "an accidental pioneer for post-Civil War Spanish professional cycling", through his international success at a time when Spain was experiencing economic hardship during the early years of the Franco era, paving the way for countrymen such as Federico Bahamontes.

Ruiz was born into a Communist Party-supporting family in Orihuela and grew up in the Valencian Community: he himself was a member of the pioneer movement in Spain during his youth. After the defeat of the Republican faction in the Spanish Civil War, his family suffered discrimination in the White Terror for their political views, with his father being banned from formal employment and forced to report to the local police station every two weeks. Being unable to find work, the family milled flour and transported it with a donkey and cart to Valencia to sell.

One of Ruiz's older brothers was forced into the Blue Division, a Spanish Army unit which fought alongside the German Army on the Eastern Front. He was the only survivor, although injured, by a Russian grenade thrown at his machine gun post, and received a war pension which enabled him to lend Ruiz the money to pay for his first bicycle, an Alcyon. He bought the bike to replace the family's donkey, which had died in a road accident, as a means of transport. According to Ruiz, he first competed unknowingly in a cycle race as a teenager when he came across a group of riders going in the opposite direction to him, and spontaneously decided to follow them, unaware that they were in competition. He took a breakthrough win at the Valencia regional championships, organised by the Franco regime's sole legal party, the FET y de las JONS, whilst still a teenager. As a result of his success, the discrimination against his family ended.

In 1945 Ruiz won the Volta a Catalunya, then Spain's most lucrative bike race, at the age of 20. This was his first race outside of the Valencian region, and helped to launch his professional career. That year he also made his debut in the Vuelta a España, where he came 23rd out of 26 finishers. He described the experience of riding the race as "terrifying". Three years later he took the overall classification in the race, taking the lead from Dalmacio Langarica after the latter lost time due to several punctures. Upon completion of the race, Ruiz was supposed to receive the winner's trophy from Francisco Franco in a ceremony at the then-new Santiago Bernabéu Stadium, however upon learning that he would have to wait three hours for a football match to be completed before the presentation, he elected to leave.

In 1949, Ruiz competed in the Tour de France as part of the Spain national team. After they received abuse from Spanish Republican exiles, Ruiz and his teammates withdrew from the race on the fifth stage and left to compete in the Volta a Portugal. As a result of the withdrawal, Spain was not invited the following year; a team was sent in 1951, including Ruiz. He took two stage wins, the first for Spain since the Civil War, and finished ninth overall. In the following year's Tour, Ruiz finished third in the general classification behind Fausto Coppi and Stan Ockers. Ruiz later said he could not have overhauled Coppi for the win, but that he had lost out on being runner-up due to his cautious descending down Mont Ventoux, which lost him four minutes to Coppi and Ockers - Ruiz stated that he was careful in his descent because he was worried about his tyres overheating.

After retiring from competition, he became a directeur sportif, including for the Faema team, where he managed Bahamontes, despite the pair having previously engaged in fistfights: Ruiz stated ahead of the 1960 Vuelta a España that "we mutually tolerate one another".

Ruiz had to race with heavy equipment because Spain was going through a depression. Ruiz is one of the few riders to complete all three Grand Tours in a single season, which he did on three occasions. As of 2020 only two other riders have accomplished this more than three times. During his career he rode a total of 21 Grand Tours, and completed 12 Grand Tours consecutively.

Major results

 1945
 1st, Overall, Volta a Catalunya
1948
 Vuelta a España
 Winner overall classification
 1st, Stage 1, (Madrid, 14 km ITT)
 1st, Stage 4, (Granada - Murcia, 285 km)
 1st, Stage 12, (San Sebastián - Bilbao, 259 km)
1951
 9th, Overall, Tour de France
 1st, Stage 10, (Clermont-Ferrand - Brive, 216 km)
 1st, Stage 21, (Briançon - Aix-les-Bains, 201 km)
 3rd, King of the Mountains Classification (tied with Hugo Koblet and Fausto Coppi)
1952
 3rd, Overall, Tour de France
1955
 1st, Stage 10, Giro d'Italia (Frascati - Frascati)
1956
 70th, Overall, Tour de France
1957
 3rd, Overall, Vuelta a España

References

Official Tour de France results for Bernardo Ruiz

1925 births
Living people
Spanish male cyclists
Spanish Tour de France stage winners
Vuelta a España winners
People from Orihuela
Sportspeople from the Province of Alicante
Directeur sportifs
Cyclists from the Valencian Community